In articulatory phonetics, fortition, also known as strengthening, is a consonantal change that increases the degree of stricture. It is the opposite of the more common lenition. For example, a fricative or an approximant may become a stop (i.e.  becomes  or  becomes ). Although not as typical of sound change as lenition, fortition may occur in prominent positions, such as at the beginning of a word or stressed syllable; as an effect of reducing markedness; or due to morphological leveling.

Examples
The extremely common approximant sound  is sometimes subject to fortition; since it is a semivowel, almost any change to the sound other than simple deletion would constitute fortition. It has changed into the voiced fricative  in a number of indigenous languages of the Arctic, such as the Eskimo–Aleut languages and Ket, and also in some varieties of Spanish. In the Southern Ryukyuan language Yonaguni, it has changed word-initially into . Another change turned  to an affricate  during the development of the Romance languages from Latin.

This has occurred in most continental Germanic languages and several English dialects, several Uralic languages, and a few Semitic languages, among others.

The product is a voiceless alveolar lateral fricative .

Examples: Old Welsh lau  to Modern Welsh  ; Old Welsh ros  to Modern Welsh  .

In  Friulian, ž > d : yoyba, jobia > dobia, doba ; gel (tosc. giallo)  > dal  ; giovane > doven ; giugno > dun 

Synchronic fortition of word-initial consonants occurs in Italian if a word-final stressed vowel precedes without intervening pause. Final stressed vowels are by nature short, and short stressed vowels precede a consonant only if that consonant ends the syllable. An item such as comprò 's/he bought' thus triggers gemination of the following consonant, whereas compra 's/he buys/is buying' does not: comprò la pasta  's/he bought the pasta' but compra la pasta  's/he buys/is buying the pasta'.    

In addition to language-internal development, fortition can also occur when a language acquires loanwords. Thus initial fricatives of loanwords are strengthened to the corresponding unlenited variant or the nearest equivalent if the fricative is not part of the phoneme inventory.

Examples from Scottish Gaelic:

Post-nasal fortition
Post-nasal fortition is very common in Bantu languages. For example, Swahili  and  become  after a nasal prefix, and  becomes ; voiceless stops become aspirated. In Bukusu,   and  become ,  becomes  , and  become . In other languages, voiceless fricatives  become affricates ; see for example Xhosa. This is similar to the epenthetic stop in words like dance in many dialects of English, which effectively is fortition of fricative  to affricate .

See also
Consonant mutation
Final-obstruent devoicing
Grimm's law
Historical linguistics
Sesotho nasalization

References

Crowley, Terry. (1997) An Introduction to Historical Linguistics. 3rd edition. Oxford University Press.

Phonology
Linguistic morphology